Cybotron was an American electro music group formed in 1980 by Juan Atkins and Richard "3070" Davis in Detroit. Guitarist John "Jon 5" Housely joined soon afterward. Cybotron had a number of singles now considered classics of the electro genre, particularly "Clear" and the group's debut, "Alleys of Your Mind," as well as "Cosmic Cars" and "R-9".

Influences
The group was inspired by midwestern funk, especially the music of George Clinton, along with German synthesizer pioneers, Kraftwerk, Japanese technopop pioneers, Yellow Magic Orchestra, English electropop, Italo disco and futurist literary influences such as Alvin Toffler's books Future Shock and The Third Wave. The name "Cybotron," is a portmanteau of cyborg and cyclotron.

Relation to techno

Although generally considered electro, Cybotron was also part of the early evolution of techno music. Cybotron was the first musical outlet of techno co-originator Juan Atkins, and the group's unique combination of musical influences, boldly experimental aesthetic and Afro-futurist philosophy became the underpinnings of Detroit Techno.

Cybotron used a synth-dominated sound, paired with a drum machine, whose rhythms were similar to those emerging from New York at the same time.  This was reflected in their first single, “Alleys of Your Mind,” which was released on their own Deep Space label and was playlisted by The Electrifyin’ Mojo in 1981. It became a local hit in Detroit, where it sold about 15,000 copies. Their next two singles, “Cosmic Cars” and “Clear” had even more success, which led to them being signed by Fantasy, a label located in Berkeley, California.

Cybotron’s music worked to mirror the atmosphere of economic desperation and alienation in Detroit in the 1980s. Songs like “Alleys of Your Mind” and “Techno City” were specifically aimed to mirror the city, using technology to capture this spirit.  Cybotron used subliminal funk pulsing amidst their crisp-and-dry programmed beats to truly reflect the dying auto industry in Detroit.

Success and breakup
Formed in 1980, Cybotron released their first singles, "Alleys of Your Mind" and "Cosmic Cars," as 7-inch records on Atkins's own label, Deep Space Records. In total, these records sold 15,000 copies. In 1983, the group was signed to the Berkeley, California-based Fantasy label and released its debut album, Enter.

In 1985, Atkins left the group due to artistic differences with Davis. Davis wanted the group to pursue a musical direction closer to rock, while Atkins wanted to continue in the electro-style vein of "Clear." After the breakup, Davis carried on and released several records as Cybotron, the last in 1995. Atkins still has an active musical career. He founded Metroplex Records and continued releasing records under several names, including Model 500, Model 600 and Infiniti. Atkins also continued DJing under his own name.

Discography

Albums
Enter (1983) (re-released as Clear in 1990) 
Empathy (1993)
Cyber Ghetto (1995)

Singles
"Alleys of Your Mind" b/w "Cosmic Raindance" (Deep Space, 1981)
"Cosmic Cars" b/w "The Line" (Deep Space/Fantasy, 1982)
"Clear" b/w "Industrial Lies" (Fantasy, 1983)
"Techno City" (Fantasy, 1984)
"R-9" (Fantasy, 1985)
"Eden" (Fantasy, 1986)

See also
Derrick May (musician)

References

External links
 Cybotron's website maintained by Rick Davis, which features a lot of his occult and science fiction interests. 
 Cybotron discography at Discogs.

Electronic music groups from Michigan
American electro musicians
Fantasy Records artists
Musical groups established in 1980